The Arnhem Space Centre (ASC) is Australia's first and only commercial spaceport, located near Nhulunbuy, in Arnhem Land, Australia. It is owned and operated by Equatorial Launch Australia (ELA),  and it is the site of NASA's first  non-orbital  sounding rocket launch from a commercial port outside the United States on 27 June 2022.

Background
The project was announced in 2019.

Description 
The spaceport is located near Nhulunbuy, a township on the Gove Peninsula in north-east Arnhem Land, in the Northern Territory. The ASC is owned and operated by Equatorial Launch Australia (ELA), which has its head office in Adelaide, South Australia.

Arnhem Space Centre is equipped to launch both sub-orbital flights and small orbital flights. The site's location, only 12 degrees south of the equator, is preferable for orbital rockets launching east, as extra speed is provided due to the spin of Earth. It is the first commercial spaceport in Australia, and  the only one.

Launches 
On 26 June 2022, the American space agency NASA used the site for its first launch from a commercial port outside the United States. The rocket was a Black Brant IX carrying a X-ray Quantum Calorimeter (XQC) instrument for UW–Madison for the purpose of X-ray astronomy  for a brief period ( 5-20 min)  in space. It was the first launch of a suborbital  sounding rocket from Arnhem Space Centre in north-east Arnhem Land. The mission was successful.

A second launch was scheduled for 4 July but was delayed until 6 July 11:17pm ACST due to weather conditions. The spacecraft, named Sistine III, was sent by NASA to investigate the properties of astronomical transits of nearby exoplanets. 

The third launch took place on 11 July 2022 at 8:31pm ACST, carrying the fourth DEUCE mission, intended by NASA to investigate and analyze the Alpha Centauri star system's ultraviolet spectrum.

 the long term future of the site is not known, but Equatorial Launch Australia has indicated that there are other space companies interested in using the rocket launch pad, and NASA has confirmed that it will use the facility again in the future.

See also

 Australian Space Agency
 Koonibba Test Range
 Whalers Way Orbital Launch Complex
 Woomera Launch Area 5

References

External links

Spaceports
Rocket launch sites
Space programme of Australia
Arnhem Land